The Tanga worm snake (Afrotyphlops platyrhynchus) is a species of snake in the Typhlopidae family.

References

platyrhynchus
Taxa named by Richard Sternfeld
Reptiles described in 1910